The 1899 season in Swedish football, starting January 1899 and ending December 1899:

Honours

Official titles

Competitions

Domestic results

Svenska Mästerskapet 1899 
Final

Rosenska Pokalen 1899 

Final

References 
Print

Online

 
Seasons in Swedish football